Benlloc is a municipality in the province of Castellón, Valencian Community, Spain, located in the comarca of Plana Alta.

Geography
Benlloc is located in the center of the Pla de l'Arc, itself in the center of Castellón. The town is an example of modern architecture and rural urbanism. It is divided into a modern and a historical section, with these subdivided into quadrants, some containing basic services with others containing plazas, houses and a fortified church. Benlloc shares a border with Alcalà de Xivert, Cabanes, Serra d'En Galceran, Torreblanca, Vall d'Alba, and Vilanova d'Alcolea.

History
The Via Augusta passes through the city, and remains of ancient Roman times are scattered throughout the surrounding region.

Administration

Demographics

Economy
The economy of Benlloc is focused around agricultural production and cattle. Due to mostly dry land in Benlloc, production of fruits and vegetables is made possible due to irrigation techniques. Pig production and poultry are also important industries. The craft industry is centered on turrónes, carpentry, construction and locksmithing.

Notable people
 Ángel Dealbert (born 1983), football player
 José Corbató Chillida (1862-1913), priest and publisher

References

External links
Official site 
Valencian Institute of Statistics 
Valencian Federation of Municipalities and Provinces - Tour guide 

Geography of the Valencian Community
Municipalities in the Province of Castellón